The Division of International Studies is one of the undergraduate divisions at Korea University in Seoul, South Korea.

Specializations
"Students are able to take all courses and do not need to officially declare a specialization. However, for students doing the Intensive Major it is advisable to specialize in one of the five areas."
Korea University Division of International Studies provides 5 tracks to the students.

 International Commerce
 International Peace & Security
 International Development & Cooperation
 Area Studies
 Korean Studies

Student’s council
The student council of Division of International Studies is organized through autonomous elections and manages various activities within the division for a year, representing and protecting the rights of its students. The council takes charge in preparing annual school events such as Ipsilenti, Ko-Yon-Jeon (Athletic Contest of both Universities: Korea Univ., Yonsei Univ.) and endeavors to enhance its students’ general welfare.

See also
Korea University
Korea University Graduate School of International Studies

References

External links
 Korea University
 Korea University Graduate School of International Studies
 Korea University Division of International Studies

Korea University schools